Friday on Elm Street (originally titled Freddy vs. Jason) is a collaborative studio album by American rappers Fabolous and Jadakiss. It was released on November 24, 2017, by Street Family Records, Roc Nation, D-Block Records, Def Jam Recordings. The album is preceded by one single, "Stand Up" featuring Future.

Background
Fabolous and Jadakiss have collaborated on a number of tracks, including "Respect It", "The Hope", "B.E.T.", Young Jeezy's "OJ" and Troy Ave's "Do Me No Favors". The album is the speculated horror theme suggested by the title named after two of horror's most popular villains Freddy Krueger and Jason Voorhees. On January 7, 2017, Fabolous and Jadakiss had an interview with HipHopDX and Fab described the theme of the album during the interview.

Release and promotion
On February 29, 2016, Fabolous posted a picture on Instagram with Jadakiss with the caption, "Freddy vs. Jason coming soon". This indicates that Fabolous and Jadakiss are releasing a joint mixtape titled, Freddy vs. Jason. On March 31, 2016, Fabolous releases a snippet of a Metro Boomin-produced song on Instagram that will appear on the album. On April 2, 2016, Fabolous and Jadakiss released a freestyle of Future's "Wicked" from his mixtape, Purple Reign (2016). That same day, Jadakiss tweeted "#FreddyVsJason" to promote the album.

On March 16, 2016, Fabolous confirmed he was releasing a project with Jadakiss, "Oh yeah man, he came to my party out at CIAA in Charlotte and we was talking about doing a couple things and one was to do a mixtape[…]I wanna do a mixtape, but we're gonna go through iTunes too." In October 2016, Lenny "Kodak Lens" Santiago, Senior Vice President of Roc Nation, told fans to prepare for the joint project. "Be excited about Fabolous and Jadakiss and what they’ve been talking about for months," he told Rap-Up. On January 17, 2017, the official trailer for the album was released. It's a blend of The Blair Witch Project, A Nightmare on Elm Street, and Friday the 13th. It's about a young woman running for her life, only to be disappointed, in tears, and haunted by a familiar yet frightening tune.

On November 21, 2017, the tracklist was officially revealed, and the album's title was changed to "Friday on Elm Street," as legal issues prevented the duo from naming it "Freddy vs Jason."

Singles
On January 13, 2017, the promotional single, "Rapture" featuring Tory Lanez was released. The song was produced by Vinylz and Cam O'Bi, which samples Anita Baker's, "Caught Up in the Rapture". The album's lead single "Stand Up" featuring Future was released on October 31, 2017.

Commercial performance
Friday on Elm Street debuted at number 10 on the Billboard 200 with 35,000 album-equivalent units, of which 20,000 were pure album sales. It is Fabolous' sixth US top 10 album and Jadakiss' fifth.

Track listing
Credits were adapted from iTunes and Tidal.

Notes
  signifies a co-producer
  signifies an additional producer
  signifies an uncredited co-producer
 "Ground Up" features background vocals from Luis Santiago.
 "Soul Food" features additional vocals from Daphne Larue.
 "Principles" features background vocals from Range.
 "Nightmares Ain't As Bad" features additional vocals from Kissie Lee.

Sample credits
 "F vs J Intro" contains samples of "You're a Customer" by EPMD and "I'm Glad You're Mine" by Al Green.
 "Theme Music" contains a sample of "Far Cry" by Marvin Gaye.
 "Ground Up" contains a sample of "Breakthrough" by Isaac Hayes.
 "Soul Food" contains a sample of "I'm Willing to Run All the Way" by Glenn Jones and the Modulations.
 "Talk About It" contains a sample of "Can We Talk" by Tevin Campbell.
 "I Pray" contains a sample of "Hands of God" by Adrian Younge.

Personnel
Credits adapted from Tidal.

Performers
 Fabolous – primary artist
 Jadakiss – primary artist
 Future – featured artist 
 Swizz Beatz – featured artist 
 Teyana Taylor – featured artist 
 French Montana – featured artist 
 Styles P – featured artist 
 Yo Gotti – featured artist 
 Jeezy – featured artist 

Technical
 Dayzel "The Machine" Fowler – recording engineer , mixing engineer 
 Steve Dickey – recording engineer , mixing engineer 
 Aneef Sheriff – assistant recording engineer 
 Ben Diehl – recording engineer 

Instruments
 RushDee – keyboard 
 Ledarius Wilson – keyboard 

Production
 Ted Smooth – producer 
 Mally the Martian – additional producer , co-producer 
 Reazy Renegade – producer 
 Swizz Beatz – producer 
 Grade A – producer 
 C-Sick – producer 
 Neo da Matrix – producer 
 Mark Henry – producer 
 KidExcluzive – co-producer 
 Ben Billions – producer 
 Schife Karbeen – producer 
 Sean C & LV – producer 
 Adrian Younge – co-producer 
 Marvino Beats – uncredited co-producer 
 Pav Bundy – producer 
 Doe Pesci – producer 
 Buku – producer 
 R8 – producer

Charts

References

Fabolous albums
Jadakiss albums
Collaborative albums
Def Jam Recordings albums
Albums produced by Swizz Beatz
Albums produced by C-Sick
Albums produced by Neo da Matrix